Jeffrey C. Elgin (born February 22, 1951) is an American politician in the state of Iowa.

Elgin was born in Cedar Rapids, Iowa. He attended West Des Moines Valley High School, where he earned letters in football, track, wrestling and baseball. He attended the University of Iowa on a football scholarship and earned a varsity letter in 1970.

He is a businessman/investor. A Republican, he served in the Iowa House of Representatives from 2001 to 2007 (51st district from 2001 to 2003 and 37th district from 2003 to 2007).

References

1951 births
Living people
Politicians from Cedar Rapids, Iowa
University of Iowa alumni
Businesspeople from Iowa
Republican Party members of the Iowa House of Representatives